Chen Wei-Ming (1881–1958) was a scholar, taijiquan teacher, and author. He was also known by his name Chen Zengze, Wei-Ming being his hao, a pen-name.

Chen came from an educated family with roots in Qishui, Hubei, China. His great-grandfather was a famous scholar; and his mother was skilled at calligraphy. As a boy, Chen prepared for the civil service exams by studying the Chinese classics, Chinese calligraphy, poetry, and essay-writing. He passed the mid-level exam of juren in 1902, and received a post in the Qing History Office. His two brothers also became scholars and authors.

Chen began to study the Chinese martial arts in Beijing under Sun Lutang (1859–1933), with whom he studied xingyi (hsing-i) and bagua (pa-kua). He then began to study taijiquan (t'ai chi ch'uan) with Yang Chengfu (1883–1936), grandson of Yang Luchan, founder of the Yang family lineage.

In 1925, Chen moved to Shanghai and established the Zhi Ruo (Achieving Softness) Taijiquan Association.

Chen recorded Yang's teachings in three books under his own name: Taijiquan shu (The Art of Taijiquan, 1925), Taiji jian (Taiji Sword, 1928), and Taijiquan da wen (Questions and Answers on Taijiquan, 1929). These books are important not only for their content, but because they were among the first taijiquan books published for a mass audience. Chen also wrote several scholarly books under the name Chen Zengze. He wrote prefaces to Sun Lutang and Zheng Manqing's taijiquan books.

Though Chen did not create a large following through his teaching as did his classmates Dong Yingjie (Tung Ying-chieh) and Zheng Manqing (Cheng Man-ch'ing), his books have remained influential and are important references about taijiquan in the early 1900s.

T'ai chi ch'uan lineage tree with Yang-style focus

Notes

References
Chen Weiming.  Taijiquan shu (The Art of Taijiquan, 1925). Section of commentary on the Taijiquan Classics translated in The Taijiquan Classics: An Annotated Translation by Barbara Davis, 2004. .
 --- Taiji jian (Taiji Sword, 1928), Translated as Taiji Sword by Barbara Davis. .
 --- Taijiquan da wen (Questions and Answers on Taijiquan, 1929). Translated as T'ai Chi Ch'uan Ta Wen: Questions and Answers on T'ai Chi Ch'uan by Benjamin Lo and Robert W. Smith. .
 Zhongguo wushu da cidian (Great Dictionary of the Chinese Martial Arts), 1990.

1881 births
1958 deaths
Chinese tai chi practitioners
Sportspeople from Hubei
Chinese baguazhang practitioners
Chinese xingyiquan practitioners
Republic of China writers
Writers from Hubei
People from Huanggang